Advanced Cyclotron Systems, Inc. (ACSI) is a company based in Richmond, British Columbia, Canada that supplies and services cyclotrons predominantly used for the production of  medical isotopes by hospitals for nuclear medicine.  The company was a spin-off of the research program at TRIUMF.  The machines are used for the production of isotopes used in Positron emission tomography (PET), Single-photon emission computed tomography (SPECT) or production of technetium-99 for molecular imaging.  ACSI controls approximately half the world market for such machines,

Four models of cyclotrons are offered:
 TR-19 (14 MeV to 19 MeV) variable energy negative ion cyclotrons
 TR-24 (15 to 24 MeV) high current cyclotron used for the production of  PET and SPECT isotopes; including one machine installed at the Université de Sherbrooke,  
 TR-FLEX (18 MeV up to 30 MeV) high current cyclotron used for PET and SPECT isotopes.
 TR-30 (15 MeV to 30 MeV) high current cyclotron used for SPECT isotopes.

References and footnotes

External links
Advanced Cyclotron Systems

Medical technology companies of Canada
Companies based in Richmond, British Columbia
Particle accelerators